The following are lists of countries by energy intensity, or total energy consumption per unit GDP.

World Resources Institute (2003)
The following is a list of countries by energy intensity as published by the World Resources Institute for the year 2003. It is given in units of tonnes of oil equivalent per million constant year 2000 international dollars.

* indicates "Energy consumption in COUNTRY or TERRITORY" or "Energy in COUNTRY or TERRITORY" links.

World energy intensity of GDP at purchasing parities from 2006 to 2009 

The following table displays the energy intensity in the world by koe/$05p (Kilogram oil equivalent per USD at constant exchange rate, price and purchasing power parities of the year 2005), by region and by country. The energy intensity are published by Enerdata and they are also available in the energy review for 2011.

The energy intensity is the ratio of primary energy consumption over gross domestic product measured in constant US $ at purchasing power parities.

In 2009, energy intensity in OECD countries remained stable at 0.15 koe/$05p, with 0.12 koe/$05p in both the European Union and Japan and 0.17 koe/$05p in the USA. It remained particularly high in CIS (0.35 koe/$05p) as well as in Africa (0.25 koe/$05p) and Middle East (0.26 koe/$05p). In Asia, energy intensity reached 0.22 koe/$05p. On the opposite, Latin America posted a relatively low ratio of 0.14 koe/$05p.

See also
List of countries by total primary energy consumption and production
List of countries by energy consumption
List of countries by energy consumption per capita
List of countries by renewable electricity production

References

Sources

 
 
Energy economics